Dunnamaggin is a Gaelic Athletic Association club situated in the south of County Kilkenny, Ireland. The club was founded in 1897, but had to wait ninety-four years for its first senior county title, taking home the junior trophy in 1994.

Despite being based in one of the smallest parishes in the county, many Dunnamaggin hurlers have gone on to play with the Kilkenny intercounty team. The club also won the senior title in 1997.

Honours
Kilkenny Senior Hurling Championships (1): 1997
Kilkenny Intermediate Hurling Championships (2): 1995, 2000
Kilkenny Junior Hurling Championships (2): 1994, 2018
Leinster Junior Club Hurling Championship (1): 2018
All-Ireland Junior Club Hurling Championship (1): 2019
Kilkenny Minor Hurling Championships (4): 1993, 1995, 1998, 2017
Kilkenny Under-21 Hurling Championships (4): 1995, 1996, 1998, 1999

Notable players
Jim ‘Link’ Walsh
Tom Walsh
Tom Hickey
Noel Hickey
Canice Hickey

External links
 Dunnamaggin on the official Kilkenny website
 Information about Dunnamaggin on the KilkennyCats website

References

Gaelic games clubs in County Kilkenny
Hurling clubs in County Kilkenny